This article is about the particular significance of the year 1960 to Wales and its people.

Incumbents

Archbishop of Wales – Edwin Morris, Bishop of Monmouth
Archdruid of the National Eisteddfod of Wales
William Morris (outgoing)
Trefin (incoming)

Events
1 January – Portmeirion Pottery is established when Susan Williams-Ellis and her husband Euan Cooper-Willis (managers of the gift shop at her father's village of Portmeirion) take over Gray's Pottery in Stoke-on-Trent (England).
5 January – Closure of the Swansea and Mumbles Railway (opened to passengers in 1807 and by this date operated by double-deck electric trams). The service is replaced by buses operated by its owner South Wales Transport.
28 June – Forty-five miners are killed in an accident at Six Bells Colliery, Monmouthshire.
6 August –  At Llandaff Cathedral a service of thanksgiving attended by Queen Elizabeth II is held to mark the end of eleven years' restoration work following air raid damage in 1941.
5 September – Poet and peace campaigner Waldo Williams is sentenced at Haverfordwest to imprisonment for six weeks for non-payment of income tax (a protest against defence spending).
3 November – Esso opens the first oil refinery at Milford Haven.

Arts and literature
29 September – Ricky Valance is the first male Welsh singer to hit number one in the charts, with his cover version of Tell Laura I Love Her.

Awards

National Eisteddfod of Wales (held in Cardiff)
National Eisteddfod of Wales: Chair – withheld
National Eisteddfod of Wales: Crown – W. J. Gruffydd, "Unigedd"
National Eisteddfod of Wales: Prose Medal – Rhiannon Davies Jones, Fe Hen Lyfr Cownt

New books
Glyn M. Ashton – Tipyn o Annwyd
Thomas Glynne Davies – Haf Creulon
Menna Gallie – Man's Desiring
Dic Jones – Agor Grwn
Kate Roberts – Y Lôn Wen
Bernice Rubens – Set on Edge
Raymond Williams – Border Country

New drama
Saunders Lewis – Esther

Music
Alun Hoddinott – Concerto no. 2
Arwel Hughes – Serch yw’r Doctor (opera)

Albums
Osian Ellis – Handel (with the Philomusica of London conducted by Granville Jones
Treorchy Male Choir – Nidaros
Die Zauberflöte (featuring Geraint Evans)

Film
Glynis Johns stars in The Sundowners.
Rachel Roberts stars in Saturday Night and Sunday Morning, becoming the first Welsh actress to win a BAFTA for Best British Actress.
Keith Baxter appears alongside Orson Welles in Chimes at Midnight.

Broadcasting
September – The Wales Television Association is formed. On 6 June, the franchise is awarded to the Wales Television Association.

Welsh-language television
Colegau Cerdd
Her Yr Ifanc

English-language television
 1 January – Broadcast of the first weekly episode of an eight-part serialization by BBC Wales of How Green Was My Valley.
 Johnny Morris narrates the imported children's TV series Tales of the Riverbank.

Sport
Boxing – Dick Richardson wins the European Heavyweight title.  Brian Curvis wins the British and Commonwealth welterweight titles.
Summer Olympics – David Broome wins a bronze medal on Sunsalve in the individual show jumping event.
Tennis – Mike Davies wins the British hard court title. He also becomes the first Welsh man to reach a Wimbledon final where he partners Bobby Wilson in the Men's Doubles.
BBC Wales Sports Personality of the Year – Brian Curvis

Births
January – Anne Boden, banking executive
16 January – Alun Huw Davies, vascular surgeon
30 January – Peter Black AM, politician (in Wirral)
6 February – Jeremy Bowen, journalist and television presenter
14 February – Dawn Bowden, politician
15 February – Russell Coughlin, footballer (d. 2016)
18 February – Rhys Parry Jones, actor
26 February – Roger Lewis, academic, biographer and journalist
30 April – Martin Phillips, darts player
3 May – Geraint Davies, politician
4 May – Elfyn Edwards, golfer
9 May – Jillian Lane, spiritual medium (d. 2013)
13 June – Sir Clive Buckland Lewis, judge
19 June – Andrew Dilnot, economist, statistician and academic
23 June – Ricky Evans, rugby union player 
29 June – Helen Mary Jones, politician (in Colchester)
13 July – Ian Hislop, satirist
24 July – Gwilym Emyr Owen III, US-born singer-songwriter of Welsh descent
1 August – Lesley Griffiths, politician
18 September 
Carolyn Harris, politician
Ian Lucas, politician
29 October – Sue Jones, Dean of Liverpool
12 December – Kelvin Smart, flyweight boxer
24 December – Carol Vorderman, television personality (in Bedford)
date unknown
Nigel Davies, chess player
Lisa Francis, politician
Gareth Jones, orchestral and choral conductor
Malcolm Pryce, novelist (in Shrewsbury)
William Owen Roberts, novelist and dramatist

Deaths

2 January – Leila Megàne, opera singer, c. 69
13 January – Reginald Herbert, 15th Earl of Pembroke, 79
17 January – E. Llwyd Williams, minister and poet, 53
19 January – Charles Jones, Wales rugby international, 66 
27 January – Joseph "Joe" Jones, dual-code rugby international, 60
25 February – Sir Edward Enoch Jenkins, judge, 65
30 March – Edward Evans, politician and disability campaigner, 77
11 April – William Llewellyn Morgan, Wales international rugby union player, 76
7 May – Mai Jones, songwriter, 61
23 May – John Edwards, politician, 77
4 June – Margaret Lindsay Williams, artist, 71
19 June – Thomas Alwyn Lloyd, architect, 78
27 June – Harry Pollitt, politician, 69
30 June – John Morgan Lloyd, musician and composer, 79
6 July – Aneurin Bevan, politician, 62
9 July – John Dyke, Wales international rugby union player, 76
24 August – Dai Edwards, Wales dual-code rugby international, 64
25 August – Tommy Jones-Davies, Wales international rugby player, 54
30 August – "Taffy" Jones, First World War flying ace, 64
31 August – Edith Picton-Turbervill, social reformer, writer and politician, 88
3 September – Frank Hawkins, rugby international, 75
27 September – George Morgan Trefgarne, 1st Baron Trefgarne, politician, 66
29 October – Horace Williams, footballer, c. 60
19 December 
Billy Bowen, dual-code rugby player, 63
Helen Parry Eden, Welsh-descended poet, 75
20 December – Harry Uzzell, Wales international rugby union captain, 77
22 December – Evan Davies, politician, 85

See also
1960 in Northern Ireland

References

Wales